Associação Esportiva Velo Clube Rioclarense, commonly referred to as Velo Clube, is a Brazilian professional association football club based in Rio Claro, São Paulo. The team competes in the Campeonato Paulista Série A2, the second tier of the São Paulo state football league.

History 
The club was founded on August 28, 1910. They won the Campeonato Paulista do Interior in 1925.

Achievements 
 Campeonato Paulista Série A2:
 Winners (1): 1925

 Campeonato Paulista Série A3:
 Winners (1): 2020

Stadium 
Associação Esportiva Velo Clube Rioclarense play their home games at Estádio Benito Agnello Castellano. The stadium has a maximum capacity of 8,198 people.

References 

Association football clubs established in 1910
Football clubs in São Paulo (state)
1910 establishments in Brazil